Munnar is a town and hill station in the Idukki district of the southwestern Indian state of Kerala. Munnar is also called the "Kashmir of South India" and is a popular honeymoon destination.

Etymology
The name Munnar is believed to mean "three rivers", referring to its location at the confluence of the Mudhirapuzha, Nallathanni and Kundali rivers.

History

The region has been inhabited by hunter-gatherer tribals like the Malayarayan and Muthuvan for thousands of years. Tradition states that Colonel Arthur Wellesley, later the Duke of Wellington, was the first British person to pass through Munnar during Tippu Sultan's campaign in Travancore, but this is unsubstantiated. The first survey of the terrain was undertaken by Benjamin Swayne Ward in 1816–1817, who followed the Periyar into the Western Ghats and established a camp at the confluence of three rivers, from which the name of Munnar is derived.

It was to be nearly 50 years later that Sir Charles Trevelyan, Governor of Madras, instructed Col. Douglas Hamilton to explore the hill country in the western part of the Madras Presidency, requesting special advice on the feasibility of establishing sanatoria for the British in the South and of developing revenue- earning projects without endangering the environment, as had happened in Ceylon where coffee had destroyed not only the rain forest but also paddy cultivation in the north-central rice bowl of ancient Ceylon. Hamilton climbed throughout the Ghats in Munnar region. 15 years later, John Daniel Munro noted that much of Munnar's land was suitable for coffee plantations. Munro, Henry Turn and his half-brother AW Turner obtained ownership of the Cardamom Hills from the Raja of Travancore and began clearing forest around Devikulam in 1879. Soon many other Europeans began establishing tea plantations in the area throughout the 1880s. Early plantations had few facilities and were mainly huts of straw. Most labourers on the tea estates were Dalits from present-day Tamil Nadu.

Eventually roads were opened to the lowlands and in Bodinayakanur in western Madras Presidency, planters got provisions from a local headman - Suppan Chetty. He and his son, Alaganan Chetty (later an MLA) would continue providing supplies to the tea estates in the region. By 1894, 26 estates were established in the hills but all were facing losses. In 1897, a separate company, Kannan Devan Hills Corporation (KDHC) was registered to operate the tea estates which was later taken over by the American Direct Tea Trading Company Ltd., who owned 26 estates, most with coffee and some with cinchona, almost all in the area except for a few in the lower areas.

In 1900, a ropeway was built and eventually monorails were installed for easier transport of goods to the plains. In 1901, P. R. Buchanan took over as General Manager and began the most extensive clearing of jungles for plantations. In 1908, construction started on a new railway which opened in 1909. By 1911, around 16,000 acres of the region was under cultivation.

In 1924, a flood swept through Munnar, damaged the road and destroyed the rail track. In its place it was decided to create a ropeway to transport tea. In 1930, this in turn was replaced by a modern road that made transport much easier. By 1952, almost 28,000 acres of land was under cultivation. After Independence, Indian planters took over. In 1964, the KDHC which owned most tea estates was acquired by Tata and Finlay who started the first instant tea factory in the country. In 1971, the Kerala government wanted to reforest all land in the hills not used for plantations. However negotiations that followed resulted in Tata keeping most of the land, leaving it with 57,000 acres.

To this day, most tea estate labourers are landless. In the early 2000s, the Viduthalai Chiruthaigal Katchi, a Dalit outfit from Tamil Nadu, started demanding land for the labourers, started making inroads into Kerala. In 2009, VS Achuthanandan promised his support for providing land to the mainly Tamil Dalit estate labourers. However, the process became very slow and as of 2018, most families still hand no land.

The former Kunda Valley Railway in Munnar was destroyed by a flood in 1924, but tourism officials are considering reconstructing the railway line to attract tourists.

Geography
Temperatures as low as  have been recorded in the Sevenmallay region of Munnar.

Köppen-Geiger climate classification system classifies it as subtropical highland (Cwb).

Transportation

Road 

Munnar is well connected by both National highways, state highways and rural roads.

Distance from major cities & tourist destinations.
 Aluva - 109 km
 Varkala - 245km
 Trivandrum - 280km
 from Kochi - Ernakulam - 150 km

Railway
The nearest major railway stations are at Ernakulam (126 km) and Aluva (110 km).  Kerala State Road Transport Corporation (KSRTC) bus stand is walking distance from Aluva Railway Station, and buses are available for Munnar every hour. The Nearest functioning Railway station is at Udumalaipettai.

Airport

Administration
The panchayath of Munnar formed in 1961 January 24 is divided into 21 wards for administrative convenience. Coimbatore district lies in the north, Pallivasal in south, Devikulam and Marayoor in east and Mankulam, Kuttampuzha panchayaths in the west.

Demographics
As of 2011 Indian census, Munnar Grama Panchayat had a total population of 32,039. 16,061 were males. and 15,968 were females, with 7,968 families total residing therein. Children represented in the age group of 0-6 were 2,916 (9.1% of the total population), which constitutes 1,478 males and 1,438 females. Munnar Panchayat had an overall literacy rate of 84.85%, substantially lower than the Kerala state average of 94.00%. Male literacy stands at 91.05% and Female literacy was 78.64%.

Flora and fauna

Most of the native flora and fauna of Munnar have disappeared due to severe habitat fragmentation resultant from the creation of the plantations. However, some species continue to survive and thrive in several protected areas nearby, including the new Kurinjimala Sanctuary to the east, the Chinnar Wildlife Sanctuary, Manjampatti Valley and the Amaravati reserve forest of Indira Gandhi Wildlife Sanctuary to the north east, the Eravikulam National Park and Anamudi Shola National Park to the north, the Pampadum Shola National Park to the south and the proposed Palani Hills National Park to the east.

Endemic species

These protected areas are especially known for several threatened and endemic species including Nilgiri Thar, the grizzled giant squirrel, the Nilgiri wood-pigeon, elephant, the gaur, the Nilgiri langur,  the sambar, and the neelakurinji (that blossoms only once in twelve years).

Land ownership
There has been action to address the problems of property takeovers by the land mafia that have, according to successive governments, plagued the area. In 2011, the government estimated that 20,000 hectares of land had been illegally appropriated and launched a campaign of evictions that had first been mooted in 2007.

See also

 Bisonvalley
 Kolukkumalai
 Kunchithanny
 Marayur
 Mattupetty Dam
 Munnar Tea Museum
2015 Munnar Plantation strike
 Pallivasal
 Rajakkad
 Wayanad

References

External links

 
Hill stations in Kerala
Populated places in the Western Ghats
Cities and towns in Idukki district
Tourism in Kerala
Tourism in Idukki district
Tourist attractions in Idukki district